Ramaswamy Temple is a Hindu temple dedicated to Rama, an incarnation of Vishnu located in Kumbakonam, Tamil Nadu, India. It is one of the prominent temples in the town and also one of the most prominent temples dedicated to Rama in India. This temple is also counted as a temple located on the banks of river Kaveri.

The temple was built during the period of Thanjavur Nayaks king Achuthappa Nayak (1560–1614) and completed during the reign of Raghunatha Nayak (1600–34). The temple is enshrined within a huge granite wall and the complex contains all the shrines and the water bodies of the temple. The rajagopuram (the main gateway) has five tiers. There are exquisite sculptures on the pillars of the temple depicting various Hindu legends. Ramayanam is depicted in pictorial format in three segments in the first precinct.

The temple has six daily rituals at various times from 6:30 a.m. to 9 p.m., and twelve yearly festivals on its calendar. The major festival in the temple is Rama Navami during the Tamil month of Panguni (March–April).

History
The temple has beautiful architecture pieces and has been built by the Thanjavur Nayak kings during the 16th century. Govinda Dikshitar, the prime minister of the Nayaks, constructed the temple. He added a commercial corridor between his new temple and the older Chakrapani temple. As per legend, the idols in the temple were found in a temple tank in the near by village Darasuram. On 9 September 2015, Ramaswamy temple's consecration (Maha kumbabhisekam) took place. The temple was built during the reign of Thanjavur Nayaks king Achuthappa Nayak (1560–1614) and completed during the reign of Raghunatha Nayak (1600–34). There are later contributions from Thanjavur Maratha kingdom.

Architecture

The temple is one of the prominent Vishnu temples in Kumbakonam. The temple has a 3-tiered gateway tower (gopuram) surrounded by walls. The central shrine houses the image of Rama in a seated posture with his consort Sita. The other images are of his brothers Lakshmana, Bharatha and Chatruguna in standing posture and Hanuman in worship posture. The sixty four pillars in the hall near the gopuram are sculpted with exquisite finesse depicting various episodes of the epic Ramayana. Each pillar is carved out of a single stone and the delicacy is very prominent. Rama in the temple is depicted with Vyakarna Mudra, while Hanuman is depicted holding manuscripts. The other important aspects of the epic like coronation of Vibishana, coronation of Sugriva, relieving Agalya from her curse and Hanuman playing veena. The temple is atypical of the Nayak style of temples.

On the walls of the prakaram (closed precincts of a temple), Ramayanam is depicted in pictorial format in three segments.  One can read through Ramayana pictorially whilst taking three pradakshinams (rounds) of the sanctum. The paintings are believed to have emerged from the Thanjavur Nayak period and were subsequently enhanced during the Thanjavur Maratha kingdom. The paintings of Ramayana are considered one of the major depictions of the epic in art form in India.

Religious importance, worship and festivals

The temple is counted as one of the temples built on the banks of River Kaveri. Five temples of Vishnu are connected with the Mahamaham festival which happens once every 12 years in Kumbakonam. These five temples together make one of the 108 Vishnu temples, Divya Desam. They are Sarangapani Temple, Chakrapani Temple, Ramaswamy Temple, Rajagopalaswamy Temple, and Varahaperumal Temple.

The temple follows Pancharatra Agama and Vadakalai tradition. The temple priests perform the puja (rituals) during festivals and on a daily basis. Like other Vishnu temples of Tamil Nadu, the priests belong to the Brahmin Vaishnavite sect, which is dedicated to Vishnu. The temple rituals are performed six times a day; Tiruvanandal at 8:00 a.m., Kala santhi at 9:00 a.m., Uchikalam at 12:30 p.m., Ntiyanusandhanam at 6:00 p.m., Irandamkalam at 7:30 p.m. and Ardha Jamam at 9:00 p.m. Each ritual comprises three steps: alangaram (decoration), neivethanam (food offering) and deepa aradanai (waving of lamps) for both Sarangapani and Thayar. The food offering during the six times are curd rice, Ven pongal, spiced rice, dosa, Ven pongal and sugar pongal respectively. The worship is held amidst music with nagaswaram (pipe instrument) and tavil (percussion instrument), religious instructions in the Vedas (sacred text) read by priests and prostration by worshippers in front of the temple mast. There are weekly, fortnightly and monthly rituals. The major festival in the temple is Rama Navami during the Tamil month of Panguni (March–April).

References

External links

Hindu temples in Kumbakonam
Rama temples
Hindu temples in Thanjavur district